Haslet is a herbed pork meatloaf.

Haslet may also refer to:

Places
 Haslet, Texas, United States

People
 John Haslet (1727–1777), American clergyman and soldier
 Joseph Haslet (1769–1823), American farmer and politician

See also 
 Haslett (surname)
 Haslett, Michigan
 Hazlet (disambiguation)
 Hazlitt (disambiguation)